Matthew Allan Anderson (born 30 November 1976) is an Australian cricketer. A slow left-arm orthodox bowler, he played in fifteen first-class matches for Queensland between 1999 and 2003.

References

External links
 
 

1976 births
Living people
Australian cricketers
Cricketers from the Northern Territory
Queensland cricketers
Sportspeople from Darwin, Northern Territory